The  doubles Tournament at the 2006 Qatar Telecom German Open took place between May 5 and May 13 on the outdoor clay courts of the Rot-Weiss Tennis Club in Berlin, Germany. Yan Zi and Zheng Jie won the title, defeating Elena Dementieva and Flavia Pennetta in the final.

Seeds

Draw

Finals

Top half

Bottom half

References
 Main Draw

Family Circle Cup - Doubles
2006 Doubles